Peter Lechner (born 15 April 1966) is an Austrian luger who competed during the late 1990s and early 2000s. A natural track luger, he won two medals at the FIL World Luge Natural Track Championships with a silver in 2003 (Mixed team) and a bronze in 2001 (Men's doubles)).

Lechner also earned a silver medal in the men's doubles event at the 1999 FIL European Luge Natural Track Championships in Szczyrk, Poland.

References
FIL-Luge profile
Natural track European Championships results 1970-2006.
Natural track World Championships results: 1979-2007

External links
 

1966 births
Living people
Austrian male lugers